No. 239 Squadron RAF was an anti-submarine squadron of the Royal Air Force during World War I. During World War II the squadron performed as an army co-operation squadron and later as a night intruder unit. After the war the squadron was disbanded.

History

Formation and World War I
No. 239 Squadron RAF was formed from No 418 (Coastal reconnaissance) Flight at Torquay, on 20 August 1918, and was equipped with the Short 184, flying anti-submarine patrols with them until the Armistice. The squadron either disbanded on 15 May 1919 or on 31 May 1919

World War II
On 18 September 1940, the squadron reformed at RAF Hatfield from a flight each of No. 16 and No. 225 squadrons. The squadron began with Westland Lysanders, and then later re-equipped with Curtiss Tomahawks and Hawker Hurricanes. The squadron converted to North American P-51 Mustangs in May 1942 and began ground attack and reconnaissance operations over Northern France, which lasted till August 1943, the squadron also taking part in the air cover during the Dieppe Raid.

In September 1943 the squadron moved to RAF Ayr to train as a night fighter unit, and re-equipped with the de Havilland Mosquito. It then moved to RAF West Raynham to join No. 100 (Bomber Support) Group, participating in night time operations against enemy fighters. On 27 October 1944 during fighter affiliation training with No. 49 Squadron RAF, a Mosquito piloted by F/Lt J.H.Roberts and accompanied by Flight Engineer Sgt. A.M.Ashcroft, stalled and crashed in Stapleford Woods, Lincolnshire, with the immediate death of both pilot and passenger.

The squadron disbanded on 1 July 1945.

Aircraft operated

References

Citations

Bibliography

 Bowyer, Michael J.F. and John D.R. Rawlings. Squadron Codes, 1937–56. Cambridge, UK: Patrick Stephens Ltd., 1979. .
 Flintham, Vic and Andrew Thomas. Combat Codes: A full explanation and listing of British, Commonwealth and Allied air force unit codes since 1938. Shrewsbury, Shropshire, UK: Airlife Publishing Ltd., 2003. .
 Halley, James J. The Squadrons of the Royal Air Force & Commonwealth 1918–1988. Tonbridge, Kent, UK: Air Britain (Historians) Ltd., 1988. .
 Jefford, C.G. RAF Squadrons, a Comprehensive record of the Movement and Equipment of all RAF Squadrons and their Antecedents since 1912. Shrewsbury, Shropshire, UK: Airlife Publishing, 1988 (second edition 2001). .

External links
 History of No.'s 236–240 Squadrons at RAF Web
 239 Squadron history on MOD site

239 Squadron
Aircraft squadrons of the Royal Air Force in World War II
Military units and formations established in 1918
1918 establishments in the United Kingdom